Civil Movement "People's Self-Defense" is a political movement in Ukraine, headed by a former SPU member Yuriy Lutsenko.

History
Yuriy Lutsenko created People's Self-Defence in January 2007 as a “broad public movement”. Its declared purpose was to secure an early parliamentary election and remove the Second Yanukovych Government. (Early elections were held on 30 September 2007.)

Possible dismantlement
In an interview with the Silski Visti (Village News) newspaper on 29 January 2009 Yuriy Lutsenko declared that "The People's Self-Defense as an insurgent, protesting, and not very structured civil movement has ceased to exist". Lutsenko also said he was planning to direct the organizational changes to the political party Forward, Ukraine!. In April 2010 Forward, Ukraine! renamed itself People's Self-Defense Political Party. Lutsenko became leader of that party.

In the spring of 2013 Lutsenko established the non-parliamentary movement "Third Republic".

See also
Yuriy Lutsenko's People's Self-Defense, electoral bloc and deputies' group

References

External links
 Official website
 People's Self-Defense: Informal website

Political movements in Ukraine
2006 establishments in Ukraine
Organizations established in 2006